Pashkaleh-ye Olya (also Romanized as Pashkaleh-ye ‘Olyā; also known as Pashgeleh-ye ‘Olyā) is a village in Cheshmeh Kabud Rural District, in the Central District of Harsin County, Kermanshah Province, Iran. At the 2006 census, its population was 41, in 9 families.

References 

Populated places in Harsin County